Azerbaijani classical music includes a range of musical styles rooted in the traditions of Western or European classical music that European settlers brought to the country from the 20th century and onwards.

History

Azerbaijan Democratic Republic era
The professional classical music in Azerbaijan is associated with name of composer Uzeyir Hajibeyov.

Soviet era
In 1920, Azerbaijani classical music had undergone a renaissance and Baku Academy of Music was founded to give classical musicians the same support as folk musicians. After World War II, Fikret Amirov introduced a new genre called symphonic mugam. Amirov's symphonic mugams were based on classical folk pieces and were performed by many renowned symphony orchestras throughout the world, such as the Houston Symphony Orchestra conducted by Leopold Stokowski.

Post-Soviet era
In the present era, classical music in Azerbaijan must contend and co-exist with a dominant culture of popular music. Specialist music education at establishments such as the Asaf Zeynally Music School in Baku and Baku Academy of Music provide music teaching to classical musicians.

Modern day advocates of Western classical music in Azerbaijani include Farhad Badalbeyli, Fidan Gasimova and Franghiz Alizadeh.

Festivals and venues

Azerbaijan is host to many major orchestras, festivals and venues. The Gabala International Music Festival and Uzeyir Hajibeyov International Music Festival have presented annual music programmes of international status since the early 21st century.

Notable Performers

Composers

 Vasif Adigozalov
 Shafiga Akhundova
 Agshin Alizadeh
 Franghiz Alizadeh
 Fikrat Amirov
 Afrasiyab Badalbeyli
 Farhad Badalbeyli
 Tofig Bakikhanov
 Faraj Garayev
 Gara Garayev
 Tofig Guliyev
 Soltan Hajibeyov
 Uzeyir Hajibeyov
 Zulfugar Hajibeyov
 Jovdat Hajiyev
 Rauf Hajiyev
 Jahangir Jahangirov
 Haji Khanmammadov
 Muslim Magomayev
 Arif Malikov
 Eldar Mansurov
 Arif Mirzayev
 Khayyam Mirzazade
 Niyazi
 Said Rustamov
 Emin Sabitoglu
 Ali Salimi
 Huseyngulu Sarabski
Asya Sultanova
 Alakbar Taghiyev
 Asaf Zeynalli

Conductors
 Elnara Kerimova

Orchestras
 Azerbaijan State Orchestra of Folk Instruments
 Azerbaijan State Symphony Orchestra

References

Classical music in Azerbaijan
classical